Zirkeyk (also Romanized as Zīrkeyk; also known as Ganzerīg, Genizī Zīrīk, and Zīnkīk) is a village in Irandegan Rural District, Irandegan District, Khash County, Sistan and Baluchestan Province, Iran. At the 2006 census, its population was 173, in 35 families.

References 

Populated places in Khash County